Juan Ramón Curbelo Garis  (born 2 May 1979) is a Uruguayan footballer currently playing for Cerro.

Club career
Curbelo started his professional career playing with Centro Atlético Fénix in 2001.

In August 2004 he was signed by Standard Liège along with his brother Jorge Curbelo.

In mid-2008 he was transferred to the Mexican club Indios de Ciudad Juárez.

International career
Curbelo has earned four caps with Uruguay, which all of them were friendly matches.

References

External links

 Profile at tenfieldigital
 Profile at Soccerway

1979 births
Living people
Footballers from Montevideo
Uruguayan footballers
Uruguay international footballers
Association football midfielders
Standard Liège players
Centro Atlético Fénix players
Club Nacional de Football players
Club Atlético River Plate (Montevideo) players
Danubio F.C. players
Indios de Ciudad Juárez footballers
Montevideo Wanderers F.C. players
C.A. Cerro players
Uruguayan Primera División players
Belgian Pro League players
Liga MX players
Expatriate footballers in Belgium
Expatriate footballers in Mexico